The Impact Knockouts World Tag Team Championship is a professional wrestling world tag team championship contested in Impact Wrestling.

The championship is generally contested in professional wrestling matches, in which participants execute scripted finishes rather than contend in direct competition. The inaugural championship team was Sarita and Taylor Wilde. The Coven (Taylor Wilde and KiLynn King) are the current champions in their first reign as a team. Individually, Wilde is in her record tying third reign, while King is in her first.  Wilde and King defeated the Death Dollz (represented by Rosemary and Taya Valkyrie) on February 26, 2023 during the Impact! tapings in Sunrise Manor, Nevada to win the titles (aired March 16).

As a team Fire N Flava (Kiera Hogan and Tasha Steelz) for the most reigns at two, while individually, Madison Rayne, Rosemary and Taylor Wilde share the record with three reigns. As a team, Eric Young and ODB have the longest reign at 478 days, while the team of Jordynne Grace and Rachael Ellering have the shortest reign at 20 days.

Title history

Names

Reigns

Combined reigns

By team

By wrestler

See also
 Women's World Tag Team Championship

References

External links
 Impact Wrestling Knockouts World Tag Team Championship at Cagematch.net

2009 in professional wrestling
Impact Knockouts
Impact Wrestling championships
Women's professional wrestling tag team championships